William Moseley Swain (May 12, 1809, in Manlius, New York – February 16, 1868, in Philadelphia, Pennsylvania) was a 19th-century American newspaper journalist, publisher, editor and newspaper owner and businessman.

He was one of the founders and proprietors of the most recent daily newspaper in Philadelphia, The Public Ledger established in 1836 (along with Arunah Shepherdson Abell (1806–1888) [also known as "A.S. Abell"], and Azariah H. Simmons) and also served as editor.  The paper was the first daily to establish a pony-express-style delivery service in the late 1830s and through the next few decades for routing their reporters/correspondents dispatches from throughout the eastern states. The system was made famous 25 years later by the United States Post Office Department in 1861 with a series of riders and horses across the Western United States from Missouri to California, at the same time of the construction of the Western Union telegraph line, coast to coast. The Ledger and its younger sister paper established a year later by both Abell and Swain in 1837, The Sun of Baltimore in neighboring Maryland to the southwest, were both of the first publications to use the new amazing technology of the electric telegraph invented by their friend, former artist/painter Samuel F. B. Morse (1791–1872), and using his Morse Code. It was first tested on a line between Baltimore at the Baltimore and Ohio Railroad's old first main terminal station on the waterfront Pratt Street in Baltimore following the right-of-way and tracks of the B. & O. Railroad's recently completed Washington Line between the two major cities to the Supreme Court chambers on Capitol Hill in the United States Capitol in the national capital city of Washington, 40 miles southwest in 1844. Both  The Sun and The Ledger made extensive use of the new revolutionary quick communications system only three years later to transmit war news of the events and battles in the Mexican–American War (1847–1848), thousands of miles to the far southwest along the Gulf of Mexico coast and interior of Mexico as the hostilities extended into the capital of Mexico City, until the surrender. In 1847, the Philadelphia Public Ledger was printed on'he first rotary press ever built.

In May 1845, Swain was one of the incorporators of the pioneering Magnetic Telegraph Company, and from 1850, served as its president. In this company, he was an associate of the inventor, Samuel F. B. Morse, and the chief promoter, Amos Kendall, who was another former newspaperman.

Swain was buried in The Woodlands Cemetery in Philadelphia, Pennsylvania.

Swain's son, William J. Swain founded a newspaper titled  The Public Record in 1870, which later became The Philadelphia Record.

References

External links
 Brief biography and genealogical information

1809 births
1868 deaths
Businesspeople from Philadelphia
19th-century American journalists
American male journalists
19th-century American newspaper founders
19th-century American male writers
Journalists from Pennsylvania
Writers from Philadelphia
Burials at The Woodlands Cemetery